2nd Floor may refer to:
 2nd Floor (Nina song)
 2nd Floor (The Creatures song)